Harry Robson Lake (29 September 1911 – 21 February 1967) was a New Zealand politician who served as Minister of Finance for six years in the second National government in the 1960s.  He died of a heart attack when only 55 years old.

Biography

Early life and career
Lake was born in Christchurch in 1911. Lake was father to two children, and grandfather to three. He attended Riccarton Primary School and Christchurch West District High School. He was further educated at the University of Canterbury, gaining a bachelor's degree in commerce. He was then employed for five years at the Vacuum Oil Company before joining a firm of public accountants, in which he later became a partner. He established an accountancy practice in 1943 and then a senior partner in the firm of Lake, Glynn and Smith. He also served a term as chairman of the Christchurch branch of the Society of Accountants.

In 1937 he married Beryl Bonnington with whom he had one son and one daughter. Lake was deemed medically unfit for active service in World War II. Instead he served within New Zealand as a duty officer in the Air Training Corps.

For several years he was an accountancy lecturer at the University of Canterbury. Lake was also a councillor of the Canterbury Manufacturers Association. He was also a member of the Christchurch Drainage Board and was chairman of its finance committee.

Political career

After holding a number of roles within the National Party's administration, he stood as the party's candidate for the Riccarton seat in the 1949 election. Riccarton was regarded as a "safe" Labour Party seat, and Lake was unsuccessful. He was the treasurer of the Canterbury-Westland division of the National Party. In the 1951 election, however, Lake won the seat of Lyttelton, which had been held by Labour for nearly forty years. While Lake held his seat in the 1954 election, he lost it in the 1957 election to Norman Kirk (who later became Prime Minister).

In the 1960 election, which National won, Lake returned to Parliament as the MP for Fendalton (a safe National seat). He was immediately elevated to Cabinet by Prime Minister Keith Holyoake, becoming minister of finance. As Lake possessed no ministerial experience before this point, his immediate appointment to one of the most powerful ministerial posts was remarkable. Undoubtedly the reason for Lake's promotion was the fact he was a close friend and political confidante of Holyoake. In recognition of his lack of experience, however, Lake was officially ranked only sixth in Cabinet, a lower position than a minister of finance would normally expect. He was also appointed Minister of Statistics and Minister of Revenue.

Despite holding one of the most powerful political positions in the country, Lake never had a high public profile. In keeping with Holyoake's desire to maintain the status quo, Lake's tenure as minister of finance was relatively uneventful, with the primary focus being on stability. In 1964, Lake suffered his first heart attack, which reduced his energy somewhat but did not impair his ability to perform his role. In 1965 he had another heart attack, by which time he was also ailing from a kidney impairment.

At the end of 1966, New Zealand encountered economic difficulties as the result of a collapse in export prices due to the end of the wool boom. Ultimately Lake did not have a chance to respond to this problem, however.

Death
In February 1967 Lake returned to Christchurch to attend the funeral of his wife's uncle, where he suffered a second heart attack, and died. He was survived by his wife and two children.

He was succeeded as minister of finance by Robert Muldoon, and as MP for Fendalton by Eric Holland.

Notes

References

External links
 Research paper on Lake's term as Finance Minister by Brian Easton

|-

|-

|-

1911 births
1967 deaths
New Zealand accountants
New Zealand finance ministers
New Zealand National Party MPs
Members of the Cabinet of New Zealand
University of Canterbury alumni
New Zealand MPs for Christchurch electorates
Members of the New Zealand House of Representatives
Unsuccessful candidates in the 1957 New Zealand general election
Unsuccessful candidates in the 1949 New Zealand general election
New Zealand people of World War II